The 1986–87 Illinois State Redbirds men's basketball team represented Illinois State University during the 1986–87 NCAA Division I men's basketball season. The Redbirds, led by ninth year head coach Bob Donewald, played their home games at Horton Field House and were a member of the Missouri Valley Conference.

The Redbirds finished the season 19–13, 7–7 in conference play to finish in fourth place. They were the number three seed in the Missouri Valley Conference tournament as Bradley University was on probation and therefore banned from postseason competition. They were victorious in a quarterfinal game versus Indiana State University and lost in a semifinal game versus Wichita State University.

The Redbirds received an at-large bid to the 1987 National Invitation Tournament. They defeated the University of Akron in the first round, Cleveland State University in the second round, and lost to the La Salle University in the quarterfinal round.

Roster

Schedule

|-
!colspan=9 style=|Exhibition Season

|-
!colspan=9 style=|Regular Season

|-
!colspan=9 style=|Missouri Valley Conference {MVC} tournament

|-
!colspan=9 style=|National Invitation {NIT} tournament

References

Illinois State Redbirds men's basketball seasons
Illinois State
Illinois State